City region is a term in use since about 1950 by urbanists, economists and urban planners to mean a metropolitan area and hinterland, often having a shared administration. Typically, it denotes a city, conurbation or urban zone with multiple administrative districts, but sharing resources like a central business district, labour market and transport network such that it functions as a single economic unit 

In studying human geography, urban and regional planning or the regional dynamics of business it is often worthwhile to have closer regard to dominant travel patterns during the working day (to the extent that these can be estimated and recorded) than to the rather arbitrary boundaries assigned to administrative bodies such as councils, prefectures, or localities defined merely to optimise postal services. Inevitably, city regions change their shapes over time and quite reasonably, politicians seek to redraw administrative boundaries by perceived geographic reality. The extent of a city region is usually proportional to the intensity of activity in and around its central business district, but the spacing of competing centres of population can also be highly influential. It will be appreciated that a city region need not have a symmetrical shape, and that is especially true in coastal or lakeside situations (such as Oslo, Southampton or Chicago).

United Kingdom
In the United Kingdom, the city regional agenda began to be seen as an alternative to the regional assemblies in England that were favoured as a partial answer to the West Lothian question but rejected in a referendum by voters in North East England in November 2004.  The concept of city regions and their development features heavily in The Northern Way, a collaborative development plan between the three northernmost English regional development agencies.  An embryonic city regional framework exists in the form of the Passenger Transport Executive and the Core Cities Group.   The October 2006 Local Government White Paper did not contain firm proposals for city-region-wide authorities however.

The New Local Government Network proposed the creation of city regions as part of on-going reform efforts, while a report released by the IPPR's Centre for Cities proposed the creation of four large city-regions based on Birmingham, Leeds, Liverpool and Greater Manchester. The strong economy of Edinburgh and its hinterland (Forth Valley, Fife, West Lothian, Midlothian and East Lothian) means it has been named as one of Europe's fasting growing city-regions.

Also in 2006, the OECD published a number of studies on city regions, including an assessment profile of the Newcastle-Gateshead city region and a review of numerous city regions across the world.

In July 2007, HM Treasury published its Review of sub-national economic development and regeneration, which stated that the government would allow those city regions that wished to work together to form a statutory framework for city regional activity, including powers over transport, skills, planning and economic development.  Under the government's Transport Innovation Fund, city regions can band together to pilot forms of road pricing, such as the Greater Manchester congestion charge considered by councils in Greater Manchester (but later rejected by referendum).  In the April 2009 Budget, the government announced that Greater Manchester and Leeds would be the first two city regions with formal powers.  While this was later discontinued as a result of the May 2010 general election, the  Conservative–Liberal Democrat coalition government did agree to the creation of the Greater Manchester Combined Authority in 2011, with all other proposals and the regional development agencies being subsumed into the local enterprise partnerships.

France 
Since January 2010 municipalities, departments and cities can combine into a larger body known as a Metropole. The first Metropole in France, Nice-Cote-d'Azur was created in 2011. In 2014 the government of Jean-Marc Ayrault passed a bill that moved away from the voluntary nature and made it mandatory for all Metropolitan areas of over 600,000 inhabitants to become Metropoles as of January 1, 2015. The first 3 mandatory Metropoles are;
 Greater Paris
 Aix-Marseille-Provence
 Lyon

Metropoles take over certain determined responsibilities from the State, other sub-national bodies or quasi-public bodies. Once devolved to the Metropole these responsibilities are the sole responsibility of the Metropole. In addition to assuming responsibility for certain policy Metropoles also take over responsibility for tax collection.

Poland 
 Metropolis GZM

Spain 
 Community of Madrid

Italy 
Metropolitan cities of Italy, previously Provinces of Italy, including Metropolitan City of Rome

Netherlands
A plusregio (also called stadsregio) is a regional public body of several Dutch municipalities in an urban area which statutory tasks are assigned under Chapter XI of the "Wet gemeenschappelijke regelingen".

Afghanistan 
Five major city regions have been identified in Afghanistan based on functional relationships. These center around Kabul and the four regional hub cities of Herat, Kandahar, Mazari-i-Sharif and Jalalabad. It is estimated that the five city regions comprise approximately one third of the total Afghan population.

References

Bibliography
Allen J. Scott (ed.) (2001) Global City-Regions: Trends, Theory Policy, Oxford: Oxford University Press.

External links
CityMayors feature on English city regions 1
CityMayors feature on English city regions 2
NLGN report Seeing the Light? Next Step for City Regions (PDF)
Centre for Cities 'City Leadership' report
Defining City Regions - Warwick Podcast

City
Urban studies and planning terminology
Regionalism (politics)